Friedrich Wilhelm August Argelander (22 March 1799 – 17 February 1875) was a German astronomer. He is known for his determinations of stellar brightnesses, positions, and distances.

Life and work 

Argelander was born in Memel in the Kingdom of Prussia (now Klaipėda in Lithuania), the son of a father of Finnish descent, Johann Gottlieb Argelander, and German (Prussian) mother, Dorothea Wilhelmina Grünlingen. He studied with Friedrich Bessel, whose assistant he became in 1820, and obtained his Ph.D. in 1822 at University of Königsberg. From 1823 until 1837, Argelander was the head of the Finnish observatory, first in Turku and then in Helsinki. He then moved to Bonn, Germany. There he designed and built a new observatory at the University of Bonn with funding approved directly by King Frederick William IV whom Argelander had become friends with in his childhood.  This lifelong friendship had started when the then crown prince temporarily lived in Argelander's parents house after the Prussian royal family fled to Memel after the Battle of Jena–Auerstedt during the Napoleonic Wars.

Argelander excelled in developing effective, simple and fast methods for measuring star positions and magnitudes, thereby making a pioneering work for modern astronomy. He also measured star distances with heliometers. His, and his collaborators', great practical works of star cataloging and variable star research were made possible by the systematic usage of then newly developed techniques.

Argelander was the first astronomer to begin a careful study of variable stars. Only a handful were known when he began, and he was responsible for introducing the modern system of identifying them. He also made a rough determination of the direction in which the Sun was moving.

In 1842, he discovered that Groombridge 1830 had a very high proper motion. For many decades its proper motion was the highest known; today it still occupies third place. For a time, it was known as Argelander's Star.

Together with Adalbert Krüger and Eduard Schönfeld, Argelander was responsible for the star catalogue known as the Bonner Durchmusterung, published between 1859 and 1862,  which gave the positions and brightness of more than 324,000 stars, although it did not cover much of the southern half of the sky. This was the last star map to be published without the use of photography.

In 1863, Argelander helped lead in the founding of an international organization of astronomers named the Astronomische Gesellschaft.

Honors and legacy 

 Elected a foreign member of the Royal Swedish Academy of Sciences in 1846.
 Elected a Foreign Honorary Member of the American Academy of Arts and Sciences in 1855.
 Elected Member of the Royal Academy of Science, Letters and Fine Arts of Belgium.
 Was awarded the Gold Medal of the Royal Astronomical Society in 1863.
 Orden Pour le Mérite für Wissenschaften und Künste (Order Pour le Mérite for Arts and Sciences - Civil class) in 1874.
 The three astronomical institutes of the Bonn University were merged and renamed as the Argelander-Institut für Astronomie in 2006.
 The crater Argelander on the Moon and the asteroid 1551 Argelander are named for him.

Further reading 
 Argelander, Friedrich Wilhelm (1822). Untersuchung über die Bahn des grossen Cometen vom Jahre 1811, 4, Königsberg
  (Parts of this article are based on this source.)

See also
 Variable star designation

References and notes 
Citations

External links 
 

 
 
Neue Uranometrie, 1843  - Full digital facsimile, Linda Hall Library.
Uranometria nova, Berlin 1843
The Uranometria Nova of F.W.A. Argelander

1799 births
1875 deaths
People from Klaipėda
Foreign Members of the Royal Society
Foreign associates of the National Academy of Sciences
People from East Prussia
19th-century German astronomers
Prussian astronomers
Recipients of the Gold Medal of the Royal Astronomical Society
Academic staff of the University of Bonn
University of Königsberg alumni
Members of the Royal Academy of Belgium
Members of the Royal Swedish Academy of Sciences
Corresponding members of the Saint Petersburg Academy of Sciences
Recipients of the Pour le Mérite (civil class)
Demidov Prize laureates
Fellows of the American Academy of Arts and Sciences
German people of Finnish descent
Members of the Göttingen Academy of Sciences and Humanities